Geoffrey Michael William Hodgkins (1 May 1902–27 October 1965) was a New Zealand naturalist. He was born in Dunedin, New Zealand on 1 May 1902.

References

1902 births
1965 deaths
Scientists from Dunedin
20th-century New Zealand botanists
New Zealand naturalists